The 1994 Players Championship was a golf tournament in Florida on the PGA Tour, held  at TPC Sawgrass in Ponte Vedra Beach, southeast of Jacksonville. It was the 21st Players Championship. 

Greg Norman set the scoring record of 264 (−24) at the Stadium Course and finished four strokes ahead of runner-up Fuzzy Zoeller. Norman opened with 63 and followed with three rounds at 67 to set the 36-hole (130) and 54-hole (197) scoring records as well.

Nick Price had set the mark the previous year at 270 (−18), three better than Mark McCumber's 273 in 1988 (equaled by Davis Love III in 1992).

Defending champion Nick Price missed the 36-hole cut by five strokes.

Venue

Eligibility requirements 
The top 125 PGA Tour members from Final 1993 Official Money List
All winners of PGA Tour events awarding official money and official victory status in the preceding 12 months concluding with the Nestle Invitational
Designated players
Any foreign player meeting the requirements of designated player, whether or not he is a PGA Tour member
Winners in the last 10 calendar years of The Players Championship, Masters Tournament, U.S. Open, PGA Championship, and NEC World Series of Golf
British Open winners since 1990
Six players, not otherwise eligible, designated by The Players Championship Committee as "special selections" 
To complete a field of 144 players, those players in order, not otherwise eligible, from the 1994 Official Money List, as of the completion of the Nestle Invitational

Source:

Field
John Adams, Fulton Allem, Michael Allen, Billy Andrade, Ian Baker-Finch, Seve Ballesteros, Dave Barr, Chip Beck, Ronnie Black, Phil Blackmar, Jay Don Blake, Michael Bradley, Mark Brooks, Billy Ray Brown, Brad Bryant, Mark Calcavecchia, Brandel Chamblee, Brian Claar, Keith Clearwater, Lennie Clements, Russ Cochran, John Cook, Ben Crenshaw, John Daly, Marco Dawson, Jay Delsing, Trevor Dodds, Ed Dougherty, David Edwards, Joel Edwards, Steve Elkington, Ernie Els, Bob Estes, Nick Faldo, Brad Faxon, Rick Fehr, Ed Fiori, John Flannery, Bruce Fleisher, Dan Forsman, David Frost, Fred Funk, Jim Gallagher Jr., Robert Gamez, Kelly Gibson, Bob Gilder, Bill Glasson, Paul Goydos, Wayne Grady, Hubert Green, Ken Green, Jay Haas, Gary Hallberg, Donnie Hammond, Dudley Hart, Nolan Henke, Scott Hoch, Mike Hulbert, Ed Humenik, John Huston, John Inman, Hale Irwin, Peter Jacobsen, Lee Janzen, Brian Kamm, Tom Kite, Greg Kraft, Neal Lancaster, Bernhard Langer, Tom Lehman, Wayne Levi, Bruce Lietzke, Bob Lohr, Davis Love III, Steve Lowery, Sandy Lyle, Andrew Magee, Jeff Maggert, John Mahaffey, Roger Maltbie, Dick Mast, Billy Mayfair, Blaine McCallister, Mark McCumber, Jim McGovern, Mark McNulty, Larry Mize, Colin Montgomerie, Jodie Mudd, Larry Nelson, Greg Norman, Mark O'Meara, Brett Ogle, David Ogrin, José María Olazábal, Masashi Ozaki, Naomichi Ozaki, Craig Parry, Steve Pate, Corey Pavin, Calvin Peete, Kenny Perry, Dan Pohl, Nick Price, Dillard Pruitt, Tom Purtzer, Mike Reid, Larry Rinker, Loren Roberts, Dave Rummells, Gene Sauers, Ted Schulz, Peter Senior, Tom Sieckmann, Scott Simpson, Tim Simpson, Joey Sindelar, Vijay Singh, Jeff Sluman, Mike Springer, Craig Stadler, Mike Standly, Payne Stewart, Curtis Strange, Steve Stricker, Hal Sutton, Doug Tewell, Jim Thorpe, David Toms, Kirk Triplett, Ted Tryba, Bob Tway, Greg Twiggs, Howard Twitty, Lanny Wadkins, Grant Waite, Duffy Waldorf, Denis Watson, Tom Watson, D. A. Weibring, Willie Wood, Ian Woosnam, Fuzzy Zoeller, Richard Zokol

Round summaries

First round
Thursday, March 24, 1994

Source:

Second round
Friday, March 25, 1994
Saturday, March 26, 1994

Source:

Third round
Saturday, March 26, 1994

Source:

Final round
Sunday, March 27, 1994

References

External links
The Players Championship website

1994
1994 in golf
1994 in American sports
1994 in sports in Florida
March 1994 sports events in the United States